Ivongius is a genus of leaf beetles in the subfamily Eumolpinae. They are found in Madagascar.

Species

 Ivongius aeneicollis (Jacoby, 1892)
 Ivongius aeneolus Bechyné, 1947
 Ivongius altimontanus Bechyné, 1964
 Ivongius andrahomanensis Bechyné, 1964
 Ivongius antennarius Harold, 1877
 Ivongius antongilensis Bechyné, 1951
 Ivongius apicatus Bechyné, 1949
 Ivongius basilewskyi Bechyné, 1964
 Ivongius bifasciatus (Jacoby, 1892)
 Ivongius bohumilae Bechyné, 1964
 Ivongius brevilatus Bechyné, 1953
 Ivongius catalai Bechyné, 1964
 Ivongius dilaticollis Bechyné, 1947
 Ivongius elongatus Bechyné, 1953
 Ivongius fortestriatus Bechyné, 1953
 Ivongius gendreaui Bechyné, 1947
 Ivongius inconstans Lefèvre, 1885
 Ivongius interruptus (Fairmaire, 1903)
 Ivongius latissimus Bechyné, 1964
 Ivongius lefevrei Jacoby, 1897
 Ivongius maculicollis Jacoby in litt.
 Ivongius madagascariensis (Jacoby, 1897)
 Ivongius minutus Jacoby, 1897
 Ivongius opacicollis Bechyné, 1951
 Ivongius parentalis Bechyné, 1964
 Ivongius pauper Bechyné, 1947
 Ivongius petulans Bechyné, 1947
 Ivongius politus Bechyné, 1964
 Ivongius rhembastoides Bechyné, 1964
 Ivongius rubidus Weise, 1910
 Ivongius rudis Bechyné, 1951
 Ivongius rufinus Harold, 1877
 Ivongius rufipes Harold, 1877
 Ivongius scissus Bechyné, 1964
 Ivongius semiopacus Bechyné, 1964
 Ivongius sericeiceps Bechyné, 1964
 Ivongius signatus (Weise, 1910)
 Ivongius suarezius Bechyné, 1964
 Ivongius subdeletus (Weise, 1910)
 Ivongius subrectus Bechyné, 1947
 Ivongius sulcatus Bechyné, 1964
 Ivongius terminatus Weise, 1910
 Ivongius thoracicus Bechyné, 1964
 Ivongius versatilis Bechyné, 1947
 Ivongius versatilis mansus  Bechyné, 1947 
 Ivongius versatilis versatilis  Bechyné, 1947
 Ivongius vetulus Bechyné, 1947
 Ivongius violaceipennis Bechyné, 1964
 Ivongius weisei Achard, 1914

References

Eumolpinae
Chrysomelidae genera
Beetles of Africa
Insects of Madagascar
Taxa named by Edgar von Harold
Endemic fauna of Madagascar